Ana Botella Serrano (born 23 July 1953) is a Spanish politician who served as the Mayor of Madrid from 2011 to 2015 and the Spouse of the Prime Minister when her husband José María Aznar. She was the first female Mayor of Madrid.

Early life 
Botella was born in Madrid on 23 July 1953. She took her primary education at the Colegio Irlandesas Madrid, associated with the Congregation of Jesus. She then studied law at Complutense University of Madrid. After graduating, she passed a public examination to the Corps of Civil Administrators of the State,

Early political career
Botella joined the People's Alliance in 1978. She served for 14 years as civil servant in the Ministry of the Interior, the Civil Governance of Logroño, the Ministry of Public Works, the Ministry of Finance, and the Ministry of Finance in Valladolid.

Politics of Madrid

Botella served on the Madrid City Council from 2003 to 2011. During her terms, she served as deputy mayor to Alberto Ruiz-Gallardón and oversaw the Departments of Social Services (2003-2007) and Environment (2007-2011). 
She was criticized for failure to tackle Madrid's air pollution which frequently exceeded permitted levels while she was responsible for the city's environment. Botella was an outspoken climate change skeptic.

When Ruiz-Gallardón resigned to become the Justice Minister in Prime Minister Mariano Rajoy's government, Botella became mayor on 27 December 2011. On 9 September 2014, Botella announced that she would not run for re-election in the May 2015 elections.

Personal life
Botella married future Spanish Prime Minister José María Aznar in 1977. The couple has three children: José María, Ana, and Alonso. Their daughter married businessman Alejandro Agag at the royal site of El Escorial on 5 September 2002. Ana Botella has four grandchildren by her daughter.

Electoral history

References

Bibliography
Botella, Ana. Mis ocho años en La Moncloa

1953 births
Living people
Mayors of Madrid
Women mayors of places in Spain
Spouses of prime ministers of Spain
People's Party (Spain) politicians
Spanish Roman Catholics
Madrid city councillors (2011–2015)
Madrid city councillors (2007–2011)
Madrid city councillors (2003–2007)